The Qualification Review Committee of the 8th National Congress of the Chinese Communist Party was elected by congress delegates in a preparatory meeting before the convening of the congress.

Members

See also
 8th National Congress of the Chinese Communist Party
 Organization of the Chinese Communist Party

References

8th National Congress of the Chinese Communist Party